The meridian 139° east of Greenwich is a line of longitude that extends from the North Pole across the Arctic Ocean, Asia, the Pacific Ocean, Australasia, the Indian Ocean, the Southern Ocean, and Antarctica to the South Pole.

The 139th meridian east forms a great circle with the 41st meridian west.

From Pole to Pole
Starting at the North Pole and heading south to the South Pole, the 139th meridian east passes through:

{| class="wikitable plainrowheaders"
! scope="col" width="130" | Co-ordinates
! scope="col" | Country, territory or sea
! scope="col" | Notes
|-
| style="background:#b0e0e6;" | 
! scope="row" style="background:#b0e0e6;" | Arctic Ocean
| style="background:#b0e0e6;" |
|-
| 
! scope="row" | 
| Sakha Republic — Kotelny Island, New Siberian Islands
|-
| style="background:#b0e0e6;" | 
! scope="row" style="background:#b0e0e6;" | Laptev Sea
| style="background:#b0e0e6;" |
|-valign="top"
| 
! scope="row" | 
| Sakha Republic Khabarovsk Krai — from 
|-
| style="background:#b0e0e6;" | 
! scope="row" style="background:#b0e0e6;" | Sea of Okhotsk
| style="background:#b0e0e6;" |
|-
| 
! scope="row" | 
| Khabarovsk Krai
|-
| style="background:#b0e0e6;" | 
! scope="row" style="background:#b0e0e6;" | Sea of Japan
| style="background:#b0e0e6;" |
|-valign="top"
| 
! scope="row" | 
|-valign="top"
| style="background:#b0e0e6;" | 
! scope="row" style="background:#b0e0e6;" | Pacific Ocean
| style="background:#b0e0e6;" | Passing just west of the island of Kōzushima, Tokyo Prefecture,  (at )
|-
| 
! scope="row" | 
| Islands of New Guinea, Yos Sudarso and New Guinea again
|-
| style="background:#b0e0e6;" | 
! scope="row" style="background:#b0e0e6;" | Arafura Sea
| style="background:#b0e0e6;" |
|-valign="top"
| style="background:#b0e0e6;" | 
! scope="row" style="background:#b0e0e6;" | Gulf of Carpentaria
| style="background:#b0e0e6;" | Passing just west of Mornington Island,  (at )
|-valign="top"
| 
! scope="row" | 
| Queensland South Australia — from 
|-
| style="background:#b0e0e6;" | 
! scope="row" style="background:#b0e0e6;" | Indian Ocean
| style="background:#b0e0e6;" | Australian authorities consider this to be part of the Southern Ocean
|-
| style="background:#b0e0e6;" | 
! scope="row" style="background:#b0e0e6;" | Southern Ocean
| style="background:#b0e0e6;" |
|-
| 
! scope="row" | Antarctica
| Adélie Land, claimed by 
|-
|}

See also
138th meridian east
140th meridian east

References

e139 meridian east